This is the order of battle of the Imperial German Navy (Kaiserliche Marine) on the outbreak of World War I in August 1914.

Commanders and locations of the Imperial German Navy

The overall commander of the Imperial German Navy was Kaiser Wilhelm II. All authority over the navy was vested in the Kaiser, and he was ultimately responsible for all decisions regarding the navy. Under the Kaiser were a number of organisational bodies responsible for various aspects of the navy's administration and operation, each of which was directly responsible to the Kaiser: 
The Naval Cabinet was a body of the Imperial Household, with responsibility over promotions and appointments, and the drafting and issuing of the Kaiser's orders.
Chief of the Naval Cabinet - Admiral Georg von Müller
The Imperial Naval Administration was the government department with responsibility for the Navy, which was answerable to the Imperial Chancellor, and was headed by the State Secretary.
State Secretary - Grand Admiral Alfred von Tirpitz
Deputy State Secretary - Vice-Admiral Eduard von Capelle
The departmental heads within the Imperial Naval Administration were:

The Admiralty Staff was formed in 1899 to replace the Naval High Command, and operated as an organisation intended to gather intelligence and prepare operational plans for presentation to and approval of the Kaiser.
Chief of the Imperial Admiralty Staff - Vice-Admiral Hugo von Pohl
Deputy Chief of Staff - Rear-Admiral Paul Behncke
Head of the Central Bureau - Rear-Admiral Albert Hopman
The Inspector-General of the Navy was a post held intermittently, intended to undertake inspection of the navy itself to ensure it was operating at maximum efficiency. The Inspector-General's office was divided into a number of individual inspectorates related to different areas of the Navy's operations.
Inspector-General of the Navy - Grand Admiral Prince Heinrich of Prussia
2nd Inspector-General - Rear Admiral Karl Zimmerman

Training schools

The navy had a number of establishments to train its personnel, both generally and in specific technical areas. In addition, a number of ships were on the strength of training establishments to provide practical experience.
Mürwik Naval School - primary training establishment for officers

Boiler and Engine Room Training Schools
 (Boiler room training ship)
 (Engine room training ship)
Gunnery training school

Torpedo training school

German naval bases

Germany had two major naval bases covering its main areas of interest:
Kiel - headquarters of the Baltic Naval Station, which was also responsible for the base at Danzig in East Prussia. 
Commander, Baltic Naval Station - Vice-Admiral Gustav Bachmann
Chief of Staff - Rear-Admiral Georg Hebbinghaus
Commander, Kiel Naval Base - Vice Admiral Konrad Henkel-Gebhardi
Commander, Kiel Fortress - Vice Admiral Reinhard Koch
Commander, Danzig Naval Base - Rear Admiral Franz von Holleben
In addition to hosting the fleet units stationed in the Baltic Sea, a number of other units were under the direct command of the Baltic Naval Station commander:
1st Seaman Division (Kiel)
1st Marine Artillery Division (Friedrichsort)
1st Torpedo Division (Kiel)
1st Battalion of Marines
As well as the warships of the fleet, a further unit of the Imperial Navy stationed at Kiel was the Imperial Yacht, which was the personal vessel of the Kaiser, used both for his annual cruise to Norway as well as transporting him on overseas visits, but was also available for use as an aviso, or despatch boat.

Wilhelmshaven - headquarters of the North Sea Naval Station, which also served as the host base of the High Seas Fleet. 
Commander, North Sea Naval Station - Vice-Admiral Günther von Krosigk
Commander, Wilhelmshaven Naval Base - Rear-Admiral Hugo Kraft
Commander, Wilhelmshaven Fortress - Rear-Admiral Friedrich Schultz
Commander, Wesermunde Fortress - Vice-Admiral Johannes Schröder
Commander, Helgoland Fortress - Vice-Admiral Leo Jacobson
As well as hosting the High Seas Fleet, other units were also under the direct command of the North Sea Station commander:
2nd Seaman Division
2nd Marine Artillery Division
3rd Marine Artillery Division
4th Marine Artillery Division
2nd Torpedo Division
2nd Battalion of Marines

In addition to its two major bases in Germany, the Imperial German Navy had a number of units stationed overseas.

Barrack ships
As well as barracks ashore, the navy maintained a number of old and withdrawn ships for use as accommodation for its personnel while in harbour.
ex-Nixe
ex-Moltke
ex-Sophie
ex-Bismarck
ex-Stein
ex-Leipzig
ex-Meteor
ex-Schwalbe
ex-Gefion
ex-Kaiser

High Seas Fleet

The High Seas Fleet (Hochseeflotte) was the primary formation of the Imperial German Navy, with its main element being the three operational battle squadrons to which the navy's battleships were assigned. The majority of units of the High Seas Fleet were stationed at Wilhelmshaven for operations in the North Sea. A small force was stationed at Kiel for use in the Baltic, which could be quickly reinforced by North Sea-based units via the Kaiser Wilhelm Canal. The High Seas Fleet was under the command of Admiral Friedrich von Ingenohl.

Battle squadrons
Fleet Flagship (Admiral Friedrich von Ingenohl)

 
1st Battle Squadron (Vice-Admiral Wilhelm von Lans)
1st Division
 (Flagship)

2nd Division (Rear-Admiral Friedrich Gädecke)
 (Flagship)

2nd Battle Squadron (Vice-Admiral Reinhard Scheer)
3rd Division
 (Flagship)

4th Division (Kommodore Franz Mauve)
 (Flagship)

3rd Battle Squadron (Rear-Admiral Felix Funke)
5th Division
The 5th Division, under Rear-Admiral Carl Schaumann, was formed of battleships of the  class. The remaining three ships were commissioned through the remainder of 1914.
6th Division
 (Flagship)

Tenders

Scouting groups

1st Scouting Group (Rear-Admiral Franz von Hipper)
 (Flagship)

2nd Scouting Group (Rear-Admiral Leberecht Maass)
 (Flagship)

3rd Scouting Group (No flag officer)
 (Flagship)

4th Scouting Group (Rear-Admiral Hubert von Rebeur-Paschwitz)
 (Flagship)

5th Scouting Group (Rear-Admiral Gisbert Jasper)
 (Flagship)

Torpedo boats

1st Torpedo Boat Flotilla
 (Flotilla Leader)
1st Half-Flotilla

 (Leader)

2nd Half-Flotilla

 (Leader)
2nd Torpedo-Boat Flotilla
 (Flotilla Leader)
3rd Half-Flotilla

 (Leader)
4th Half-Flotilla
 (Leader)

3rd Torpedo-Boat Flotilla
 (Flotilla Leader)
5th Half-Flotilla
 (Leader)

6th Half-Flotilla

 (Leader)
4th Torpedo-Boat Flotilla
 (Flotilla Leader)
7th Half-Flotilla 

 (Leader) 
8th Half-Flotilla 
 (Leader)

5th Torpedo-Boat Flotilla
 (Flotilla Leader)
9th Half-Flotilla

 (Leader)
10th Half-Flotilla

 (Leader)
6th Torpedo-Boat Flotilla
 (Flotilla Leader)
11th Half-Flotilla
 (Leader)

12th Half-Flotilla
 (Leader)

7th Torpedo-Boat Flotilla
 (Flotilla Leader)
13th Half-Flotilla
 (Leader)

14th Half-Flotilla
 (Leader)

8th Torpedo-Boat Flotilla
 (Flotilla Leader)
15th Half-Flotilla

 (Leader)

16th Half-Flotilla

 (Leader)

U-boats and Mine warfare

1st U-boat Flotilla
 (Flotilla Leader)
1st Half-Flotilla
 (Leader)

2nd Half-Flotilla
 (Leader)

2nd U-boat Flotilla
 (Flotilla Leader)
3rd Half-Flotilla
 (Leader)

4th Half-Flotilla
 (Leader)

Tenders
ex-Irene

1st Minesweeping Division
 (Leader)

2nd Minesweeping Division
 (Leader)

3rd Minesweeping Division
 (Leader)

Minelayers

SMS Königin Luise

Coastal defence

A number of small units were formed whose primary purpose was coastal and harbour defence of the various naval bases in and around Wilhelmshaven. These usually consisted of one or more light cruisers, commanding a number of torpedo-boat destroyers and other vessels. To provide heavy support for coastal defence, one of the reserve squadrons of the High Seas Fleet, consisting of eight obsolete coastal defence ships that were of no use as part of the main battle fleet, was assigned to the North Sea coast.

 
6th Battle Squadron (Rear-Admiral Richard Eckermann)
11th Division
 (Flagship)

12th Division (Rear-Admiral Ehler Behring)
 (Flagship)

Coast Defence Division Ems (Emden)
 (Leader)

Outpost Half-Flotilla Helgoland (Heligoland)
 (Leader)

Coast Defence Division Jade/Weser (Wilhelmshaven)
 (Leader)

Coast Defence Division Elbe (Cuxhaven)
 (Leader)

Baltic Fleet

Although part of the High Seas Fleet, the force stationed permanently at Kiel for operations in the Baltic operated with a degree of independence. Grand Admiral Prince Heinrich of Prussia, the brother of Kaiser Wilhelm II, was the commander-in-chief of the Baltic Fleet, with Rear-Admiral Robert Mischke in operational command of units at sea.

Coast Defence Group Baltic

Fleet Flagship (Grand Admiral Prince Heinrich of Prussia)
 
Cruisers (Rear-Admiral Robert Mischke)
 (Flagship)

Torpedo-Boat Flotilla

U-boat Flotilla

SM U-1
SM U-2
SM U-3
SM U-4
Minelayers

Battle squadrons
 
4th Battle Squadron (Vice-Admiral Ehrhard Schmidt)
7th Division
 (Flagship)

8th Division (Rear-Admiral Hermann Alberts)
 (Flagship)

5th Battle Squadron (Vice-Admiral Max von Grapow)
9th Division
 (Flagship)

10th Division (Kommodore Alfred Begas)

 (Flagship)

Outpost Half-Flotilla Kiel / Elder

Torpedo-Boats

Other ships

Naval Aviation

The Imperial German Navy had a small aviation capability, which was originally formed in 1913 when the Kaiser decreed the foundation of the Naval Aviation Forces (Marinefliegerkräfte). Within the newly formed aviation section were two separate commands - the Naval Airship Detachment, based at Nordholz, near Cuxhaven, and the Naval Flying Detachment, which was split between Kiel, Heligoland and Putzig.

Naval Airship Detachment
Zeppelin L 3
Naval Flying Detachment
1st Naval Flying Detachment
Kiel Detachment
Heligoland Detachment
Putzig Detachment

Overseas units

In addition to the main body of the Imperial German Navy stationed in home waters, Germany also maintained a number of overseas deployments of ships. The majority of these were usually of one or two cruisers operating independently, with the primary formation of German warships outside German waters being the East Asia Squadron, under the command of Vice-Admiral Maximilian von Spee, which was stationed at Tsingtao. The navy also provided a significant proportion of the garrison at Tsingtao, with approximately 1,200 of the 3,000 strong garrison coming from one of the marine battalions. The other major formation was the Mediterranean Division, commanded by Rear-Admiral Wilhelm Souchon. 

East Asia Squadron (Vice-Admiral Maximilian von Spee)
 (Flagship)

Mediterranean Division (Rear-Admiral Wilhelm Souchon)
 (Flagship)

East and West America station

East African station

West African station

South Sea station

Tsingtao Garrison
3rd Battalion of Marines

Notes

References

Further reading
 
 
 
 

World War I orders of battle
Imperial German Navy
Naval units and formations of Germany in World War I
Germany